In Pursuit of Polly is a lost 1918 American silent comedy-drama film starring Billie Burke and Thomas Meighan. It was produced by Famous Players-Lasky and released by Paramount Pictures.

Plot
As described in a film magazine, Polly Marsden (Burke) is told by her father Buck Marsden (Losee) that she must choose from among her three suitors. She decides to settle it by a race. She is to be given an hour head start and agrees to bestow her hand upon the first one who catches her. In trying to elude her pursuers, she is mistaken for the confederate of a German spy. When the three suitors catch her, they discover that her heart and hand have been won by secret service agent Colby Mason (Meighan).

Cast
Billie Burke as Polly Marsden
Thomas Meighan as Colby Mason
Frank Losee as Buck Marsden
A. J. Herbert as Talbot Sturgis
William B. Davidson as Larry O'Malley
Alfred Hickman as O'Leary
Ben Deeley as Emile Kremer

References

External links

AllMovie.com

1918 films
American silent feature films
Lost American films
Films directed by Chester Withey
Paramount Pictures films
1918 comedy-drama films
1910s English-language films
American black-and-white films
1918 lost films
Lost comedy-drama films
1910s American films
Silent American comedy-drama films